Dyakonovsky 1-y is a rural locality (a khutor) and the administrative center of Akchernskoye Rural Settlement, Uryupinsky District, Volgograd Oblast, Russia. The population was 451 as of 2010. There are 10 streets.

Geography 
Dyakonovsky 1-y is located on Akchernya River, 20 km southwest of Uryupinsk (the district's administrative centre) by road. Akchernsky is the nearest rural locality.

References 

Rural localities in Uryupinsky District